Numerous military installations have been located in Michigan since the earliest French fortified trading posts appeared to modern National Guard bases. The Native Americans of the area established only temporary war camps although some were quite large (Chief Pontiac's 6-month encampment during the siege of Fort Detroit had around 1,000 warriors). The earliest French bases were quite small and short-lived. Later some installations would be in use for over a century (Fort Wayne, Fort Mackinaw) and spread over large areas (Fort Custer - , Camp Grayling - 147,000 acres (590 km2)).

In chronological order:

French colonial forts

Fort Miami, at St. Joseph, Michigan, a stockade built by René-Robert Cavelier, Sieur de La Salle, in use from late 1679 to 1680
Fort de Buade, in 1683 the Jesuit mission at St. Ignace was fortified, Fort de Buade was built in 1690 and was used until 1701
Fort St. Joseph, Port Huron, built 1686, abandoned 1688
Fort St. Joseph at Niles, Michigan, built in 1691, given to Britain 1761
Fort Pontchartrain du Détroit, built in 1701, replaced Fort de Buade, turned over by the French to Britain in 1760 who used it until 1779, when it was replaced by Fort Lernoult 
Fort St. Philippe de Michilimackinac, (commonly called Fort Michilimackinac), at the Straits of Mackinac, built 1715 during the Fox Wars, turned over by the French to Britain in 1761 who used it until 1781, replaced by Fort Mackinac
Fort de Repentigny, at Sault Ste. Marie, built in 1751, captured by the British in 1760

British colonial forts

The British assumed control of French forts in Michigan after defeating the French in the French and Indian War. 
Fort Detroit, in use from 1760 until 1779, when it was replaced by Fort Lernoult
Fort de Repentigny, captured by the British in 1760, destroyed by fire in 1762 
Fort Michilimackinac, in use from 1761 until 1781, replaced by Fort Mackinac
Fort St. Joseph, in use from 1763 until 1780, occupied by Spanish militia for one day in 1781
Fort Sinclair, St. Clair County, built 1765, abandoned about 1785
Fort Lernoult, built in 1779, turned over to the Americans in 1796, in British hands again during part of 1812-1813
Fort Mackinac, built in 1781, turned over to the Americans in 1796, captured in the War of 1812, it was again under British control from 1812 to 1815
Fort George, an inland blockhouse on Mackinac Island, during the War of 1812, renamed by Americans, Fort Holmes
Fort Drummond, Drummond Island, built 1815, closed 1828

American establishments

Forts and other Army bases

Although the U.S. nominally controlled Michigan after the 1783 Treaty of Paris, several forts remained in British hands for more than a decade.
Fort Lernoult, turned over to the Americans in 1796, renamed Fort Detroit, in British hands again during part of 1812–1813, renamed Fort Shelby, abandoned 1826
Fort Mackinac, built in 1781, turned over to the Americans in 1796, captured in the War of 1812, it was again under British control from 1812 to 1815, closed 1895
Fort Gratiot, built in 1814, finally abandoned 1879 
Fort Holmes, an inland blockhouse and redoubt built by the British as Fort Holmes on Mackinac Island during the War of 1812, renamed by Americans Fort Holmes but soon abandoned by the U.S. Army
Grosse Ile Stockade, Grosse Ile, built 1815, closed 1819
Fort Brady, Sault Saint Marie, built 1822, closed 1944 (except for an antiaircraft battery in place until 1962)
Fort Saginaw, Saginaw, built 1822, abandoned 1824
Detroit Arsenal, Dearborn, built 1832, sold off in 1877 
Fort Wayne, Detroit, built 1843, in use until the 1970s (the Army Corps of Engineers still maintains a boatdock here)

Fort Wilkins, Copper Harbor, built 1844, abandoned 1870 
Camp Butler, Mount Clemens, built 1861, closed 1865
Camp Backus, Detroit, built 1862, dismantled about 1865
Camp Lyon, Detroit, built 1861
Camp Williams, Adrian, built 1861
Camp Ward, Detroit, early 1860s
Camp Eaton, Brighton, built 1898, closed 1900
Camp Grayling, Grayling, built 1914, still in use
Fort Custer, Battle Creek, built 1917, still in use

Air Force Bases and Naval Air Stations

See also Michigan World War II Army Airfields.

Michigan's northern location made it a good site for several Cold War air bases, especially Strategic Air Command B-52 / KC-135 bases. Numerous other sites around the state had antiaircraft gun or missile installations during the Cold War.
 
Selfridge Air National Guard Base, Mount Clemens, built 1917, originally an Air Force Base, transferred to Air National Guard, still in use
Wurtsmith Air Force Base, Oscoda, built 1923, closed 1993 per BRAC 
Naval Air Station Grosse Ile, built 1929, closed 1969
Raco Air Force Station / Kincheloe AFB BOMARC Site, Raco, built 1940, closed 1972
Kincheloe Air Force Base, Sault Ste. Marie, built 1941, closed 1977 as part of post-Vietnam force reductions (also called Kinross)
K.I. Sawyer Air Force Base, Marquette County, built 1955, closed 1995 per BRAC
Alpena Combat Readiness Training Center, still in use
Battle Creek Air National Guard Base at W. K. Kellogg Airport, still in use
Calumet Air Force Station, USAF radar installation
Custer Air Force Station, USAF radar installation, built 1952, closed 1965
Empire Air Force Station, built 1950, closed 1978
Grand Marais Air Force Station, USAF radar installation, built 1954, closed 1957
Port Austin Air Force Station, USAF radar installation, built 1951, closed 1988
Willow Run Air Force Station, operated 1952-1959

Other
Detroit Arsenal Tank Plant, Warren, built 1940, under the United States Army Materiel Command 
Hart–Dole–Inouye Federal Center, Battle Creek, acquired 1942, a Defense Logistics Agency location
Seafarer, at Republic, Michigan, built 1980, dismantled 2004, U.S. Navy submarine communication antenna site
Station Grand Haven, US Coast Guard's District 9 Field Office

See also

 
.
Michigan-related lists
List of military installations in Michigan
List of military installations in Michigan
Michigan
Michigan